β-Pinene is a monoterpene, an organic compound found in plants. It is one of the two isomers of pinene, the other being α-pinene. It is colorless liquid soluble in alcohol, but not water. It has a woody-green pine-like smell.

This is one of the most abundant compounds released by forest trees. If oxidized in air, the allylic products of the pinocarveol and myrtenol family prevail.

Sources 
Many plants from many botanical families contain the compound, including:

 Cuminum cyminum
Humulus lupulus
 Pinus pinaster
 Clausena anisata
 Cannabis sativa

References

Flavors
Perfume ingredients
Vinylidene compounds
Monoterpenes
Bicyclic compounds
Cyclobutanes